Charlotte Rose Teller, later Hirsch (March 3, 1876 – December 30, 1953), also using the pen name John Brangwyn, was an American writer and socialist active in New York City. She graduated in 1899 from the University of Chicago (BA). Her book The Cage was published in 1907. Mark Twain had offered to endorse it "in the form of a letter to the actress Maude Adams". Mary Haskell introduced Teller and Kahlil Gibran to each other in January 1908.

Her marriage to Frank Minitree Johnson ended in a divorce. On October 14, 1912, she married Gilbert Julius Hirsch (December 16, 1886 – May 3, 1926); they had a son, Richard, born September 12, 1914.

References

External links

1876 births
1953 deaths
American women writers
University of Chicago alumni